The Alfa Romeo Pandion is a concept car which premiered at the 2010 Geneva Motor Show. It was designed by Stile Bertone and the main responsibility was given to Mike Robinson. The Pandion coupé was designed as a tribute to Alfa Romeo’s centennial anniversary. 

The most eye catching feature of the car is its doors, they open by rotating backwards, opening full 90 degree upward, the whole side of the car is one door  
from the front fender to the rear fender. Earlier Bertone has made other similar door designs, like in the 1968 Alfa Romeo Carabo and the 1970 Lancia Stratos 0.

Other notable design feature can be found on the rear of the car, which has a striking array of crystal-like blades.

Its very thin seats are the first to contain integrated illumination due to a new fabric lightbulb.

References

External links

 

Rear-wheel-drive vehicles
Pandion
Bertone concept vehicles